Nikhil Ranjan Dey is an Indian politician from BJP. In May 2021, he was elected as the member of the West Bengal Legislative Assembly from Cooch Behar Dakshin.

Career
Dey is from Kotwali, Cooch Behar district. His father's name is Nirmal Kumar Dey. He passed Higher Secondary from Ram Bhola Higher Secondary school in 1974. He contested in 2021 West Bengal Legislative Assembly election from Cooch Behar Dakshin Vidhan Sabha and won the seat on 2 May 2021.

References

Living people
Year of birth missing (living people)
21st-century Indian politicians
People from Cooch Behar district
Bharatiya Janata Party politicians from West Bengal
West Bengal MLAs 2021–2026